Phillip Brent Krakouer (born 15 January 1960) is a former Australian rules footballer who played for the North Melbourne Football Club during the 1980s. Notable for his speed, freakish skills and an uncanny ability to pass the ball to his brother, Jim Krakouer, who also played for North Melbourne. The position favoured for Phil Krakouer was as a half-forward flank or wingman.

The Krakouer brothers, the children of Eric and Phoebe Krakouer, were born and lived in Mount Barker, Western Australia. The brothers played their first senior football for Mount Barker for the North Mount Barker Football Club as teenagers, where their incredible skills were first noticed. Phil made his league debut for the Claremont Football Club in 1978, whilst elder brother Jim had made his Claremont debut the year before.

In 1982, both Krakouer brothers left to play for the North Melbourne Football Club (Kangaroos) after they had helped Claremont in winning the previous year's WAFL premiership.

Phil played 141 games for North Melbourne and 7 for Footscray. He also topped the North Melbourne goalkicking list on three occasions: 1983, 1985 and 1987.

Phil Krakouer is the uncle of AFL player Andrew Krakouer who played for Richmond and then Collingwood. Andrew Krakouer won a Sandover Medal when playing for Swan Districts in the WAFL. Phil is also the uncle of former Port Adelaide and Gold Coast player Nathan Krakouer.

References

Further reading
 Sean Gorman (2005) Brotherboys: The Story of Jim and Phillip Krakouer, Allen & Unwin, 2005 

North Melbourne Football Club players
Claremont Football Club players
Western Bulldogs players
1960 births
Living people
Indigenous Australian players of Australian rules football
Australian rules footballers from Western Australia
People from Mount Barker, Western Australia